Apostegania is a genus of moths in the family Geometridae.

Sterrhinae
Geometridae genera